Tân Sơn Nhất International Airport  is the busiest airport in Vietnam with 32.5 million passengers in 2016 and 38.5 million passengers in 2018. It serves Ho Chi Minh City as well as the rest of southeastern Vietnam. As of January 2017, it had a total capacity of only 25 million passengers, which has caused constant congestion and sparked debate for expanding or building a new airport. The airport's IATA code, SGN, is derived from the city's former name of Saigon. It was the 25th busiest airport in the world in 2020.

Of the routes the airport offers, the domestic Ho Chi Minh City – Hanoi route is the busiest in Southeast Asia and the sixth
 busiest in the world, serving 10,253,530 customers in 2019.

History

Tan Son Nhat International Airport has its origins in the early 1930s when the French colonial government constructed a small airport with unpaved runways, known as Tân Sơn Nhứt Airfield near the village of Tan Son Nhut. By mid-1956, with U.S. aid, a  runway had been built; the airfield near Saigon became known as South Vietnam's principal international gateway. During the Vietnam War (or Second Indochina War), Tan Son Nhut Air Base (then using the alternative spelling Tân Sơn Nhứt) was an important facility for both the U.S. Air Force and the Republic of Vietnam Air Force. Between 1968 and 1974, Tan Son Nhut Airport was one of the busiest military airbases in the world. Pan Am schedules from 1973 show that during the last days of South Vietnam, Boeing 747 service was being operated four times a week to San Francisco via Guam and Manila. Continental Airlines operated up to 30 Boeing 707 military charters per week to and from Tan Son Nhut Airport during the 1968–74 period.

Post-war era
On 9 December 2004, United Airlines became the first U.S. airline to fly to Vietnam since Pan Am's last flight during the Fall of Saigon in April 1975. Flight UA 869, operated using a Boeing 747-400 landed at Ho Chi Minh City, the terminus of the flight that originated from San Francisco via Hong Kong. On 29 October 2006, this service was switched from San Francisco to Los Angeles with a stop in Hong Kong, operating as UA 867 (also using a 747–400). In 2009, the service UA 869 has resumed once again from San Francisco via Hong Kong International Airport. United ended the route to San Francisco via Hong Kong on 30 October 2011. The airline resumed the route from Ho Chi Minh City to Hong Kong after its merger with Continental Airlines. The flight until suspended, no longer made a stop at San Francisco and was flown on a Boeing 777-200ER instead of the 747-400.

In 2006, Tan Son Nhat International Airport served approximately 8.5 million passengers (compared with 7 million in 2005) with 64,000 aircraft movements. It has recently accounted for nearly two-thirds of the arrivals and departures at Vietnam's international gateway airports. Due to increasing demand (about 15–20% per annum), the airport has been continuously expanded by the Southern Airports Corporation.

In 2010, Tan Son Nhat domestic terminal handled 8 million passengers, its maximum capacity. The airport reached its full capacity of 20 million passengers in 2013, two years earlier than predicted. Both domestic and international terminal are being expanded to meet the increasing demand. In December 2014, expansion for the domestic terminal was finished, boosting the terminal's capacity to 13 million passengers per annum. In September 2017, People's Army of Vietnam ceded 21 hectare of military land in the vicinity of the airport to Airports Corporation of Vietnam for civil use. This gave way for the construction of 21 new aircraft parking spaces, expected to be completed by Tet holidays in 2018. Tan Son Nhat will then have 72 parking spaces for airplanes.

Of the routes the airport offers, the Ho Chi Minh City – Hanoi route is the busiest in Southeast Asia and the seventh busiest in the world, serving 6,769,823 customers in 2017.

International terminal

A new international terminal funded by Japanese official development assistance and constructed by a consortium of four Japanese contractors (KTOM, abbreviation of four contractors' names: Kajima – Taisei – Obayashi – Maeda), opened in September 2007 with an initially designed capacity of 10 million passengers a year. In 2014, the terminal served over 9 million international passengers and a demand of an expansion to the terminal was in sight. The first phase of an urgent expansion to the terminal was finished in December 2016 with an addition of 2 new jet bridges and other facilities. Upon the completion of phase two, the terminal can handle 13 million passengers annually.

Facilities
Following the opening of its new international terminal in September 2007, Tan Son Nhat has two major terminal buildings with separate sections for international and domestic flights.

Airlines and destinations

Passenger

Cargo

Statistics

Aircraft movement

Number of passengers

Cargo volume (tons) 

Source: Civil Aviation Authority of Vietnam

Ground transportation

Bus and shuttle
A bus station is situated in front of the international terminal and is served by Ho Chi Minh City Bus. It is connected to the city center by bus line 109 and 152 as well as shuttle bus line 49. Connecting the airport to Vung Tau and other cities in Mekong Delta are express minibus services as well as bus line 119 (via Mien Tay Bus Station).

Metro
The airport is expected to be served by Ho Chi Minh City Metro Line 4B, connected to Line 4 and 5 with services to the southern and eastern area of the city. However, it is currently not known when the line will be constructed.

Taxi
There are several options for getting a taxi from the airport to the city

 Main taxi queue. Traditional taxi brands such as Vinasun and Mai Linh operate at the airport alongside Grab, a ridesharing company.
 Other taxi counters are also available in the terminal building, including SASCO, ACV Unico, Song Viet.

Road
Until 2016, the airport only had one main access route via Truong Son Street, which caused chronic congestion for traffic going in and out of the airport. As an effort to ease traffic bottleneck, in August 2016, Pham Van Dong Boulevard officially opened and connected the airport to National Route 1 in an intersection east of the airport.

Accidents and incidents
Throughout its history there have been several incidents that happened at the airport, some of the most notable are summarized below:
On 4 April 1975, a Lockheed C-5A Galaxy, operated by the United States Air Force as part of Operation Babylift en route to Clark Air Base in the Philippines, crashed on approach during an emergency landing. Out of 328 people on board (311 passengers and 17 crew members), 155 people were killed.
On 12 January 1991, a Vietnam Airlines-operated Tupolev Tu-134, registration VN-A126, with 76 passengers on board crashed on final approach to Ho Chi Minh City. At , the Tupolev suddenly lost height and landed hard, touched down with the left main gear first. There were no casualties but the aircraft was written off due to substantial damage.
On 4 September 1992, Vietnam Airlines Flight 850, an Airbus A310-300 en route from Bangkok to Ho Chi Minh City, was hijacked by Ly Tong, a former pilot in the Republic of Vietnam Air Force. Tong proceeded to drop anti-communist leaflets over Ho Chi Minh City before parachuting out of an emergency exit. Vietnamese security forces arrested him on the ground two hours later. The aircraft landed safely, and no one on board was injured.
On 20 November 2014, the 3-unit uninterruptible power supply of Ho Chi Minh City Area Air Control Center went offline, causing a blackout to the center that oversees air traffic from and to Tan Son Nhat from 11:05 AM to 12:19 PM. This incident also disabled the radar system, halting air traffic control capabilities. Overall, 92 flights were affected, 54 of them were within Ho Chi Minh flight information region and 8 were preparing to land at Tan Son Nhat at the time of the incident. No air traffic accident occurred and operations fully resumed by noon the next day.
On 22 April 2017, Tan Son Nhat International Airport was the site of an alleged terrorist attack. Two remotely controlled petrol bombs were planted at the airport, one in the International Terminal while the other was placed in the airport's parking garage. The bomb in the terminal failed to detonate due to internal sabotage. The bomb in the garage initially also failed to detonate because the activator was out of range. It was subsequently moved and set off in the International Terminal's departure hall where the first bomb was originally placed. No one was injured nor killed in the attack. A total of 15 people were arrested for involvement in the attack, according to the Vietnamese state media.

Future plans

New Airport

Tan Son Nhat International Airport is located inside the crowded urban core of Ho Chi Minh City, making expansions difficult. In a report submitted to the Vietnamese National Assembly in 2015, legislators deemed continued expansion of Tan Son Nhat problematic in five aspects. Firstly, it would be more economically viable to build a new airport rather than extensively upgrade Tan Son Nhat. An estimated US$9.1 billion was reportedly needed for a new 4,000 m runway, a new passenger terminal and other facilities at Tan Son Nhat. Secondly, Tan Son Nhat airspace overlaps with that of Bien Hoa Airport, which is currently reserved for national defense purpose. A reduction in military activities in Bien Hoa is considered to be temporary and unsustainable. At the same time, Tan Son Nhat also acts as a strategic location in national defense; therefore, the airport cannot be used entirely for civic air transport. Additionally, due to its urban location, aside from increasing ground traffic stress in its access points, the airport cannot operate between midnight and 5AM in accordance to the International Civil Aviation Organization sustainable development goals, further limiting its capability.

However, Ho Chi Minh City People's Assembly thought otherwise. They believe that building a new airport can be impractical and unrealistic, giving that the numbers supporting the new airport are "wrong calculations, magical stats" to "trick others with a purpose of serving their own designs." The cost of construction is too high in the midst of already-suppressed national debt, stressing the people without fully-diagnosed value. It is believed that the delay of the expansion is due to the military-run golf course at the north of the airport, where the land is listed as "defense land." Ho Chi Minh City hired an independent French consultant firm ADPi to evaluate the suggestions. The firm supported the idea of expansion at first, but then called off and delayed its final statement, and finally released a report to support the new airport proposition. The city's Assembly responded that the report was rigged.

Following Decision 703/QĐ-TTg by the Vietnamese Prime Minister in July 2005, a new airport—Long Thanh International Airport—was planned to replace Tan Son Nhat airport for international departure use. The initial master plan for the new airport was publicly announced in December 2006.

The project will be divided in three stages. Stage One calls for the construction of two parallel runways and a terminal with a capacity of 25 million passengers per year, due to be completed in 2020. Stage Two is scheduled for completion in 2030, giving the airport three runways, two passenger terminals and a cargo terminal designed to receive 1.5 million metric tons of cargo and 50 million passengers per year. The final stage is scheduled to be initiated after 2035, envisioned to handle 100 million passengers, 5 million metric tons of cargo annually on an infrastructure of 4 runways and 4 passenger terminals. The total budget for the first stage alone was estimated to be US$6.7 billion.

Expansion
Because Long Thanh will not be ready for service until at least 2025, Tan Son Nhat must expand to meet the increasing demand. In January 2017, Airport Design and Construction Consultancy (ADCC) presented 3 proposals to expand the airport. Vietnam's Deputy Prime Minister Trịnh Đình Dũng agreed to proceed a US$860 million upgrade proposal for final review before submitting to the government. Under the chosen proposal, there would be a new mixed-use Terminal 3 and a civil-use Terminal 4 (to be built on the south side of the airport), a parallel taxiway between the existing runways and technical hangars on the northeast. The estimated time to complete the upgrade would be 3 years and the airport would then have a capacity of 43–45 million passengers annually. The decision was controversial due to the fact that the golf course immediately north of SGN would remain untouched despite the urgent need of airport expansion. The Minister of Transport Trương Quang Nghĩa explained that the airport could not be expanded northward due to costs and environmental impact. On 12 June 2017, Prime Minister Nguyễn Xuân Phúc requested the Ministry of Transport to research the prospect of constructing a third runway at Tan Son Nhut International Airport. The French consulting company ADP Ingénierie (ADPi) was subsequently hired to provide a second opinion for the project.

In March 2018, ADPi presented their plan for the expansion. The firm advised against the construction of a third runway and supported a southward expansion plan. Without a new runway, Tan Son Nhut has a maximum capacity of 51 million passengers per year – a number ADPi predicted SGN to reach in 2025, in time for the opening of Long Thanh. However, an independent consultancy of Ho Chi Minh City believed it could reach up to 80 million by the time Long Thanh was supposed to open, in accordance with reports by Boeing or the International Air Transport Association. As such, they proposed a three-phase northward expansion plan that would see a new runway and two new terminals to increase the airport's capacity to 70 million passengers per year.

On 28 March 2018, Prime Minister Nguyễn Xuân Phúc ultimately selected the ADPi proposal as the basis for the expansion of the airport. This proposal includes a new Terminal 3 with a designed capacity of 20 million passengers per year south of Runway 07R/25L, additional facilities in the north area where a golf court currently occupies as well as improvements and constructions of access points for the airport.

See also

 Bombing of Tan Son Nhut Air Base
 Da Nang International Airport
 Noi Bai International Airport
 List of airports in Vietnam

References

External links

 Tan Son Nhut Airport official website (holding page as of 2017.11.09)
 Tan Son Nhut Airport on City Government website (in Vietnamese, not updated since ~2011)
 Tan Son Nhut Airport unofficial website
 Southern Airports Corporation Official Website (SAC)
 Southern Airports Services Joint Stock Company Official Website (SASCO)
 Sasco Travel, a subsidiary of SASCO
 Tan Son Nhut Airport Transfer
 Saigon Ground Services official website, a subsidiary of SAC
 Tan Son Nhut International Airport Ground Services (TIAGS) official website; a subsidiary of Vietnam Airlines
 Tan Son Nhut airport – Terminals
 News Item on Fire at Airport on Monday 27 October 2008

Airports in Vietnam
Transport in Ho Chi Minh City
Buildings and structures in Ho Chi Minh City